Lessingianthus is a genus of South American plants in the sunflower family.

 Species

References

External links
 USDA Plants Profile
 Jepson Manual Treatment

Vernonieae
Asteraceae genera